Lithoglypha is a fungal genus in the family Acarosporaceae. It is monotypic, containing the single species Lithoglypha aggregata, a saxicolous (rock-dwelling), crustose lichen found in South Africa. Both the genus and species were proposed in 1988 by lichenologist Franklin Andrej Brusse in 1988. The genus name is derived from the Greek roots lithos ("rock") and glyphe (referring to writing or engraving on a stone tablet). The lichen is only known to occur in the Clarens Formation of South Africa.

References

Acarosporales
Lecanoromycetes genera
Lichen genera
Taxa described in 1988